Movie Connections is a BBC One documentary series which looks at the stories behind the production of popular British films, showing how they tie in with the production of other movies through the actors or actresses. The shows feature interviews with some of the cast and crew of the subject film, as well as classic footage.

The series follows Comedy Connections (2003) and Drama Connections (2005), which used the same format to look at the history of popular television comedies and dramas respectively.

The series consist of eight episodes each, all of which are narrated by Ashley Jensen.

Films examined

Series one (2007)

Four Weddings and a Funeral (10 September)
The Commitments (17 September)
Billy Elliot (24 September)
Lock, Stock and Two Smoking Barrels (1 October)
Bend It Like Beckham (8 October)
Shakespeare in Love (15 October)
Brassed Off (22 October)
Gregory's Girl (5 November)

Series two (2009)

Monty Python and the Holy Grail (7 January)
Summer Holiday (14 January)
Sliding Doors (21 January)
Trainspotting (26 January)
Shirley Valentine (4 February)
Buster (11 February)
Local Hero (18 February)
Calendar Girls (25 February)

External links
 
 

2007 British television series debuts
BBC Scotland television shows
BBC television documentaries
2009 British television series endings